Russia competed at the 1994 Winter Olympics in Lillehammer, Norway.  It was the first time the nation had competed at the Winter Olympic Games since the dissolution of the Soviet Union in 1991.  Russian athletes had competed as part of the Unified Team at the 1992 Winter Olympics.

Medalists

Competitors
The following is the list of number of competitors in the Games.

Alpine skiing 

Men

Women

Biathlon 

Men

Women

Bobsleigh

Cross-country skiing 

Men

Women

Figure skating

Freestyle skiing 

Men

Women

Ice hockey 

Men
Head coach:  Viktor Tikhonov

Preliminary round

Play-off
Quarterfinal

Semifinal

 Bronze medal match

Luge

Nordic combined

Short track speed skating 

Men

Women

Ski jumping

Speed skating 

Men

Women

References
Official Olympic Reports
International Olympic Committee results database

Nations at the 1994 Winter Olympics
1994
Winter Olympics